Sankhvast (also Romanized as Sankhvāst; also known as Sanghas, Sangkhuast, Sankhāş, and Sankhāst) is a city and capital of Jolgeh Sankhvast District, in Jajrom County, North Khorasan Province, Iran. At the 2006 census, its population was 2,009, in 590 families.

References 

Populated places in Jajrom County

Cities in North Khorasan Province